The Kapudan Pasha (Modern Turkish: Kaptan Paşa), also known in Turkish as Kaptan-ı Derya ("Captain of the Seas"), was the commander-in-chief of the navy of the Ottoman Empire. Around 160 captains served between the establishment of the post under Bayezid I and the office's replacement by the more modern Ottoman Ministry of the Navy (Bahriye Nazırlığı) during the Tanzimat reforms.

The title of Kapudan Pasha itself is only attested from 1567 onwards; earlier designations for the supreme commander of the fleet include derya begi ("beg of the sea") and re'is kapudan ("head captain").

See also
 List of Fleet Commanders of the Ottoman Navy, for the Kapudan Pasha's replacements after 1877
 List of Ottoman admirals, for Turkish commanders beneath the rank of the Kapudan Pashas

Sources 

 
Ottoman Navy lists
Kapudan
Kapudan Pasha